is a Japanese author and rock musician.

Books (written in Japanese) 
Kagami no Naka no Glass no Fune (A Glass Ship in the Mirror)
Suishoh no Yoru (Christal Nacht)
Rolling Kids
Rockn'roll Games
Macintosh High

Albums 
Backstreet

References

Japanese writers
Japanese musicians
1953 births
Living people
People from Chiba (city)
Musicians from Chiba Prefecture